Friedrich VII, Count of Zollern (died after 6 October 1309) was a German nobleman.  He was the ruling Count of Zollern from 1298 until his death.

Life 
He was the elder son of Count Friedrich VI from his marriage with Kunigunde (1265–1310), a daughter of Rudolf I of Baden.

In 1298, he married Euphemia (d. 1333), a daughter of Count Albrecht II of Hohenberg-Rotenburg.  This marriage had been mediated by Emperor Rudolf I himself, and brought an end to many years of rivalry between the Swabian Counts of Zollern and Hohenberg.

Friedrich VII died after 6 October 1309.  After his death, the County of Zollern was inherited by his younger brother Friedrich VIII.

Issue 
Friedrich and Euphemia had two sons:
 Fritzli I (d. 1313), Lord of Zollern
 Albrecht (d. 1320), married Guta of Gutenstein

References 
 Ludwig Schmid: Geschichte der Grafen von Zollern-Hohenberg, Gebrüder Scheitlin, 1862, p. 115
 E. G. Johler: Geschichte, Land- und Ortskunde der souverainen teutschen Fürstenthümer Hohenzollern Hechingen und Sigmaringen, Stettin'sche Buchhandlung, Ulm, 1824, Online
 Gustav Schilling: Geschichte des Hauses Hohenzollern in genealogisch fortlaufenden Biographien aller seiner Regenten von den ältesten bis auf die neuesten Zeiten, nach Urkunden und andern authentischen Quellen. Fleischer, Leipzig, 1843, Online

Counts of Zollern
House of Hohenzollern
13th-century births
1309 deaths
Year of birth unknown
13th-century German nobility